St Margaret Mary's Secondary School is a co-educational, denominational, comprehensive secondary school located in Castlemilk, Glasgow, Scotland.

History
The school originally opened in 1962. The original buildings were demolished in 2002, with a new, smaller school opening in 2004.  This was part of a widespread program of rebuilding and refurbishing schools throughout Glasgow by Glasgow City Council in a PFI program. St Oswald's Secondary School and St Margaret Marys Secondary School are now working together at the St Margaret Mary's Secondary School building. St Oswalds Secondary School moved into the St Margaret Mary's building.

Notable former pupils
 Arthur Graham (b. 1952), footballer
 James McCarthy (b. 1990),  footballer
 William Ruane (b. 1985), actor

References

External links
St Margaret Mary's Secondary School's page on Scottish Schools Online

Catholic secondary schools in Glasgow
1962 establishments in Scotland
2002 disestablishments in Scotland
2004 establishments in Scotland
Educational institutions established in 1962
Educational institutions disestablished in 2002
Educational institutions established in 2004